Samir Aiboud (born February 2, 1993) is an Algerian footballer who plays for Algerian Ligue Professionnelle 1 club CS Constantine.

Club career
On February 22, 2013, Aiboud made his senior debut for JS Kabylie, coming as a substitute in the 61st minute in a league match against CR Belouizdad.

In 2019, Aiboud signed a contract with CR Belouizdad.

References

External links
 
 

1993 births
Algeria under-23 international footballers
Algerian footballers
Algerian Ligue Professionnelle 1 players
ES Sétif players
JS Kabylie players
Living people
Footballers from Tizi Ouzou
Association football midfielders
21st-century Algerian people